Vijay Amritraj defeated Tim Wilkison 7–6, 5–7, 6–1, 6–2 to win the 1977 New Zealand Open singles competition. Onny Parun was the champion but did not defend his title.

Seeds
A champion seed is indicated in bold text while text in italics indicates the round in which that seed was eliminated.

  Vijay Amritraj (champion)
  Chris Lewis (semifinals)
  Russell Simpson (quarterfinals)
  Anand Amritraj (second round)
  Richard Lewis (semifinals)
  Steve Docherty (second round)
  Paul McNamee (first round)
  Bob Giltinan (first round)

Draw

Key
 Q - Qualifier

NB: The Quarterfinals, Semifinals and Final were the best of 5 sets while the First and Second Round were the best of 3 sets.

Final

Section 1

Section 2

External links
 Singles draw

ATP Auckland Open
1977 Grand Prix (tennis)